Events in the year 1841 in Belgium.

Incumbents
Monarch: Leopold I
Prime Minister: Joseph Lebeau (to 13 April); Jean-Baptiste Nothomb (from 13 April)

Events
13 April – Nothomb ministry comes to power.
8 June – Parliamentary elections.
15 July – Exposition des Produits le l'Industrie Nationale opens in Brussels.
19 September – Founding of the Royal Academy of Medicine of Belgium.

Publications
Periodicals
Almanach de la cour
Almanach royal de Belgique (Brussels, Librairie Polytechnique)
Annuaire de l'Académie royale des sciences et belles-letres de Bruxelles
Annuaire dramatique de la Belgique
Bulletins de l'Académie Royale des Sciences, des Lettres et des Beaux-Arts de Belgique
Journal de Bruxelles begins publication.
Messager des sciences historiques
La renaissance: Chronique des arts et de la littérature, 2.
 Revue belge, vol. 17 (Liège, A. Jeunehomme)
Revue de Bruxelles

Monographs and reports
 Joseph Jean De Smet (ed.), Recueil des chroniques de Flandre, vol. 2 (Brussels, Commission royale d'Histoire)
 Xavier Heuschling, Essai sur la statistique générale de la Belgique, 2nd edition (Brussels, Etablissement Géographique)
 François Joseph Ferdinand Marchal, Histoire des Pays-Bas autrichiens (Brussels, Deprez-Parent)
 M. E. Perrot, Revue de l'exposition des produits le l'industrie nationale en 1841 (Brussels)

Guide books
 A. Ferrier, Guide pittoresque du voyageur en Belgique (3rd edition, Brussels, Société Belge de Librairie)

Art and architecture

Paintings
 Louis Gallait, The Abdication of Charles V
 Antoine Wiertz, La Chute des Anges rebelles

Buildings
 Jean Baptiste De Baets, St. Stefanus, Ghent
 Greenhouses of the Botanical Garden of Liège

Births
25 January – Cornelius Van Leemputten, painter (died 1902)
12 July – César De Paepe, syndicalist (died 1890)
12 August – Leon Van Loo, photographer (died 1907)
20 November – Victor D'Hondt, lawyer (died 1902)
6 December – Aimé Dupont, photographer (died 1900)

Deaths
23 March – Jean-Baptiste Thorn (born 1783), politician
10 April – Henri Van Assche (born 1774), painter
28 April – Henri-Joseph van den Corput (born 1790), pharmacist
20 August – Constantinus Fidelio Coene (born 1780), painter

References

 
1840s in Belgium